The 1967 Brownlow Medal was the 40th year the award was presented to the player adjudged the fairest and best player during the Victorian Football League (VFL) home and away season. Ross Smith of the St Kilda Football Club won the medal by polling twenty-four votes during the 1967 VFL season.

Leading votegetters

References 

1967 in Australian rules football
1967